Joseph Michael Manganiello (born December 28, 1976) is an American actor. His professional film career began when he played Flash Thompson in Sam Raimi's Spider-Man. His breakout role was as werewolf Alcide Herveaux in five seasons of the HBO series True Blood.

He is also known for his roles in films such as Magic Mike, Magic Mike XXL, Pee-wee's Big Holiday, What to Expect When You're Expecting, Sabotage and Rampage. In late 2013, he became a published author when his first book, Evolution, was released by Simon & Schuster's Gallery Books. His directorial debut came in 2014 with the documentary feature La Bare, which he also produced and financed. He is also known for his role as Brad Morris in How I Met Your Mother. He is active with several charities, primarily UPMC Children's Hospital of Pittsburgh for which he serves on the board of trustees. In 2016, he was cast as Slade Wilson / Deathstroke in the DC Extended Universe, making his first appearance in 2017's Justice League.

Early life
Manganiello was born in Pittsburgh to Susan and Charles Manganiello. His mother is of German and Armenian descent. Manganiello's maternal great-grandmother was a survivor of the Armenian genocide where her husband and seven of her children were murdered and her eighth child drowned during her escape across the Euphrates River. She later encountered a German soldier in an internment camp for survivors, whose child she gave birth to, Manganiello's grandmother. Manganiello's father was born outside of Boston and of Italian descent. In the early 2020s, Henry Louis Gates and the researchers of PBS' Finding Your Roots uncovered that Manganiello's legal grandfather, surnamed Manganiello, was not his biological grandfather; and that his biological paternal grandfather was a mixed-race African-American man. Using this information, they traced his paternal lineage back to Manganiello's fifth great-grandfather, Plato Turner, an African slave who was freed before slavery was abolished in Massachusetts, who then went on to fight for the Continental Army during the American Revolution.

Manganiello was raised in Mt. Lebanon, Pennsylvania. He has a younger brother, Nicholas. He was a student at St. Bernard School, a Catholic elementary school in Mt. Lebanon, and then attended Mt. Lebanon High School, where he graduated with honors in 1995 and won the school's Great Alumni Award in 2011. Growing up, he was the captain of his football, basketball, and volleyball teams and went on to play at the varsity level in all three sports. He won the role of Jud Fry in his school's senior year production of Oklahoma! and was involved with the school's TV studio. He would borrow equipment in order to write and direct films with his friends, which eventually inspired him to begin studying acting.

Manganiello suffered a series of nagging sports injuries through High School, including a torn medial collateral ligament while returning a kickoff in a varsity football game against Ringgold High School. The time off allowed Manganiello to reevaluate his future and so he decided to audition for the Carnegie Mellon School of Drama during his senior year. He was not accepted, so he enrolled at the University of Pittsburgh and worked tirelessly over the next year in the theater. He then reapplied to Carnegie Mellon a year later, and was awarded a scholarship as one of only 17 students accepted into the acting program that year. There he performed in theater productions and wrote, produced, and acted in a student film entitled Out of Courage 2: Out for Vengeance. He graduated in 2000 with a Bachelor of Fine Arts degree in acting. He then traveled to New York City and Los Angeles through his university to participate in group auditions, which provided him contacts in the entertainment business including an agent, a manager, and a screen test for Sam Raimi’s Spider-Man.

Career

Early career

While a student at Carnegie Mellon University, Manganiello appeared in numerous productions in Pittsburgh's theatre scene, including Ulfheim in Henrik Ibsen's When We Dead Awaken, Lorenzo in Shakespeare's The Merchant of Venice for Quantum Theatre, and Joe in the Pittsburgh premiere of The Last Night of Ballyhoo. He moved to Los Angeles, California after graduating from Carnegie Mellon. He quickly signed with a talent agent, and three days later, he auditioned for the role of Peter Parker in the Sam Raimi-directed film Spider-Man (2002). He landed the role of Eugene "Flash" Thompson, Peter Parker's nemesis, as his first acting job out of college. He reprised the role several years later, making a brief cameo in Spider-Man 3 (2007).

Manganiello began finding work in television, playing Tori Spelling's boyfriend on VH1's So Notorious in 2006, and guest starred on Las Vegas, Jake in Progress, and Close to Home. That year, he also played John Leguizamo's Alcoholics Anonymous sponsor in the CBS television pilot Edison. In 2007, he appeared in the Scrubs episode "My No Good Reason" and in the MyNetwork TV nighttime soap opera American Heiress. He also played Officer Litchman, the love interest to Linda Cardellini's character, for a four-episode arc on NBC's ER. He returned to the stage playing The Chick Magnet in May 2007 for the New York City premiere of Skirts & Flirts, a monologue show by Gloria Calderon Kellett, for which he was a finalist for HBO's Aspen Comedy Festival. He then played Stanley Kowalski in A Streetcar Named Desire for the West Virginia Public Theatre in 2008, directed by his former Carnegie Mellon professor Geoffrey Hitch.

He starred as Leo Belraggio, a New York jazz musician, in the West Coast premiere of Terrence McNally's Unusual Acts of Devotion in June 2009. The play was staged at the La Jolla Playhouse at the University of California in San Diego. The summer prior, Manganiello worked alongside McNally and director Leonard Foglia to create the role at the Ojai Playwrights Conference. He played the lawyer Brad Morris on several seasons of the CBS comedy How I Met Your Mother. In 2008, he joined the cast of The CW drama One Tree Hill for its fifth season, playing bartender Owen Morello. He shot the series in Wilmington, North Carolina, and returned for its sixth and seventh seasons.

Manganiello played Stu on the Fox sitcom 'Til Death for two episodes, and starred in the short film Wounded that year, which he originated on the stage and won Best Short Film at the 2011 Big Island Film Festival. He starred in the direct-to-video war film Behind Enemy Lines: Colombia in 2009 playing Lt. Sean Macklin, a Navy SEAL squad leader. In order to add authenticity to the production, he trained for several months with a former Navy SEAL, for whom he paid to come to the set and stay in the cast's hotel. The film was shot in Puerto Rico. He appeared in an episode of Medium in 2009, and has guest starred on all three series of CBS's CSI television franchise (CSI: Crime Scene Investigation, CSI: Miami, and CSI: NY). He had a role in the independent film Irene in Time. In 2010, he appeared in television commercials for Taco Bell, promoting its new product. He shot television pilots for 100 Questions and the Pittsburgh-set sitcom Livin' on a Prayer.

True Blood
In late 2009 Manganiello was cast as werewolf Alcide Herveaux in the third season of HBO's True Blood. His work on the show over the next five years would bring him both popular and critical recognition, including being voted The Favorite Pop-Culture Werewolf of All-Time by the readers of Entertainment Weekly Magazine, the 2011 Scream Award for Breakout Performance – Male, as well as a shared award for Best Ensemble, a Saturn Award for Best Guest Starring Role in Television and a NewNowNext Award. True Blood was his favorite television show before he joined the cast. He was originally brought in by casting for the role of Coot, another werewolf in the series, but was asked by the producers to read for Alcide instead. He familiarized himself with the novels while growing out his hair and beard. He also trained twice a day for months to add muscle to match the description of the character in the books. Manganiello also got a suntan to set himself apart from the vampires on the series and spent time studying live wolves.

In early 2011, Manganiello was asked to screen test for the title role of Superman in Man of Steel, for which he was rumored to be the front runner, but due to scheduling problems with True Blood, he was forced to drop out during the final stage. He told Access Hollywood in an interview: "They wanted me to screen test and they actually asked for my measurements for the suit and everything... their shoot date switched and it would have taken up 11 weeks out of my True Blood schedule. At the end of the day, we couldn't get the schedule to work... so, regrettably, I never got to screen test, I never got to put the suit on." 

Upon completion of filming for season four of True Blood, he shot an episode of USA's White Collar with his former drama school classmate Matt Bomer, and then shot the film adaptation of the best selling book What To Expect When You're Expecting before returning to Los Angeles to shoot an episode of Two and a Half Men with Ashton Kutcher.

Magic Mike and other projects
Manganiello was cast as Big Dick Richie in Steven Soderbergh's Magic Mike, the story of a male stripper in Tampa, Florida, played by actor Channing Tatum. Magic Mike would go on to become a cultural and box office phenomenon spawning its 2015 sequel Magic Mike XXL.

In between Magic Mike films and finishing out his last two seasons of True Blood, Manganiello branched out in a multitude of different ways. He shot David Ayer's Sabotage with his childhood idol Arnold Schwarzenegger, who would go on to become a friend and mentor to Manganiello, penning the foreword to his book Evolution which was released through Simon & Schuster's Gallery Books in the fall of 2013. That autumn also saw Manganiello's return to the stage once again as Stanley Kowalski in A Streetcar Named Desire but this time for the prestigious Yale Repertory Theater in New Haven, Connecticut.

A few months later Manganiello would take his documentary film La Bare, which he financed, directed, and produced under his new production company banner 3:59 with his brother Nick, to Park City, Utah for the Slamdance Film Festival. He received multiple offers from distributors in the lobby after the first screening and within 24 hours sold the International and Domestic rights, including sales to Showtime and Netflix. Manganiello was given the Triple Threat Award, from the Maui International Film Festival later that year for his work on the film.

After True Blood
In August 2016, test footage of Slade Wilson/Deathstroke was posted to Twitter by writer/director Ben Affleck. A few weeks later, Geoff Johns, DC Comics' then President and CCO, who was tasked to co-write/co-produce the solo Batman film with Affleck, confirmed that Deathstroke would appear in the shared film universe, with Manganiello portraying the character. In 2019, he was confirmed to appear in the Ben Affleck Batman movie. However, Affleck was asked to step down from the film and Manganiello's future as the character has remained uncertain ever since.

In 2017, Manganiello won an Emmy as the narrator of the documentary Pittsburgh is Home: The Story of the Penguins, which documented the first 50 years of history of the Pittsburgh Penguins hockey team.

Dungeons & Dragons / Fantasy 
Over the years Manganiello has worked extensively with Dungeons & Dragons as a writer, official ambassador, and paid consultant. His characters, including Arkhan the Cruel are a part of Dungeons & Dragons canon, appearing in adventure modules, video games, and in toy stores. He has appeared in episodes of The Big Bang Theory, Nerd Poker, CelebriD&D, Critical Role and the web series Force Grey playing the game. In 2017, Manganiello and John Cassel wrote a spec-script for a film adaptation of the first Dragonlance novel for Warner Brothers.  In 2018, he launched the company Death Saves which produces fantasy/heavy-metal themed streetwear as well as a range of high end jewelry, clothing and gaming accessories. Over the years, the company has created officially licensed products for the television series Game of Thrones and The Dark Crystal: Age of Resistance, the indie horror film Mandy, Dungeons & Dragons, and at one point had full reign over the catalog of the late fantasy painter, Frank Frazetta.

He worked as a game designer for Hasbro's remake of the adventure board game Hero Quest to write a quest book as a stretch goal in 2020. Although the stretch goal was not reached, he later announced he worked with Hasbro to have the quest book and additional game pieces included anyway. 

In October 2022, Hasbro's eOne announced that Manganiello had been tapped to direct and produce the first, official documentary about the history of Dungeons & Dragons, along with co-director Kyle Newman and his brother and producing partner Nick under their 3:59 banner, to be timed to release during the 50th anniversary of the game in 2024.

Personal life
Manganiello is a life-long fan of the Pittsburgh Steelers. He directed and produced the 2007 short documentary DieHardz about Steelers fans who meet up at bars in Los Angeles, California. He is also a noted Pittsburgh Penguins fan and hosted the 2017 NHL Awards and the 2017 NHL Expansion Draft.

On a trip to Sydney, Australia he attended a Wests Tigers rugby league match.

He was once a roadie for the band Goldfinger and is friends with lead singer John Feldmann; he toured internationally with the group as a member of their security.

He became engaged to actress Sofía Vergara on Christmas Eve 2014 after six months of dating. They married in Palm Beach, Florida on November 22, 2015.

He is a long time practitioner of Transcendental Meditation and learned at David Lynch’s center in Los Angeles.

Filmography

Film

Television

Web shows and series

Directing

Awards and nominations

References

External links

 
 

1976 births
Living people
20th-century American male actors
21st-century American male actors
African-American male actors
American male film actors
American male television actors
Carnegie Mellon University College of Fine Arts alumni
Ethnic Armenian male actors
Male actors from Pittsburgh
People from Mt. Lebanon, Pennsylvania